The Sextener Rotwand or Zehner is a mountain in the Sexten Dolomites in South Tyrol, Italy. During the so-called "White War" in World War I, the mountain was heavily contested by the armies of Italy and Austria-Hungary.

References 

 Richard Goedeke: Sextener Dolomiten. (Alpine Club Guide) Bergverlag Rother, 1988.

External links 

Mountains of the Alps
Mountains of South Tyrol
Sexten Dolomites